Balthazar Napoleon IV de Bourbon (born 29 July 1958) claims to be the senior descendant of the House of Bourbon and thus the pretender to the throne of the defunct Kingdom of France. His family, the "Bourbons of India", claim to be legitimate descendants of the House of Bourbon, descended from Jean Philippe de Bourbon, Count of Clermont-en-Beauvaisis, an exiled French noble who served in Mughal Emperor Akbar's court. The family is also known as "Bourbon-Bhopal", a name derived from the city of Bhopal in central India where their last few generations have resided and worked in the royal court of the princely Bhopal State. Balthazar Napoleon IV de Bourbon, the current head of the family is a lawyer and a part-time farmer by profession. He is married to Elisha Pacheco and has three children: Frederick, Michelle, and Adrian. His mission is "to preserve for history the political, cultural and religious contribution of the Bourbons of India in the subcontinent and prevent this important contribution from being relegated to a footnote in history books."

On 22 May 2013, the Ambassador of France to India visited Bhopal and met with Balthazar of Bourbon at a function and in a statement declared, "It is extraordinary to have a Bourbon here today!"

In his historical novel, Le Rajah Bourbon, the publication of which spurred a renewed interest in this claim to the French throne, Prince Michael of Greece and Denmark claimed that Balthazar Napoleon IV is the eldest in line to the French throne. Prince Michael of Greece said he would be willing to organize a DNA test to verify de Bourbon's claim of kinship.

See also
List of heirs to the French throne

References

Bibliography

Further reading

Fiction

Non-fiction

External links
 Bourbon-Bhopal, The Royal "House of Bourbon" in India official website
 

1958 births
Living people
Indian Roman Catholics
People from Bhopal
Pretenders to the French throne